The 2007 Man Booker Prize was awarded at a ceremony on 16 October 2007. The Prize was awarded to Anne Enright for The Gathering.

Judges
Howard Davies (Chair)
Wendy Cope
Giles Foden
Ruth Scurr
Imogen Stubbs

Shortlist

Longlist

Sources
 2007 Man Booker Prize

Man Booker
Booker Prizes by year
2007 awards in the United Kingdom